Credlin Keneally (originally announced as Credlin & Keneally) was an Australian television news and commentary program broadcast weekly on Sky News Australia. The program was co-hosted by Peta Credlin and Kristina Keneally and features long-form discussion of political issues between the presenters.

The format marks the first time a program on Sky News has been hosted by two women. The program is the first permanent hosting position for Credlin, who joined Sky News as a contributor in May 2016. It is the fourth format Keneally has hosted, having previously co-hosted axed programs The Cabinet and Keneally and Cameron, while she continues co-hosting daytime program To The Point with Peter van Onselen. The announcement came just three months after the pair guest hosted an episode of The Friday Show together.

The program was broadcast from the Sky News centre in the Sydney suburb of Macquarie Park. It premiered on 16 November 2016 at 8pm AEDT. The program was put into hiatus in May 2017.

Episodes

Season 1 (2016)

Season 2 (2017)
The second season returned on 1 February 2017 with guests Tony Shepherd and Chris Richardson. The following episode featured guest Catherine McGregor. From the third episode, the program changed format which resulted in the program not having regular guests. Instead, Credlin and Keneally discuss five political issues from the week between themselves.

Note
  Episode 5 was guest co-hosted by Laura Jayes due to Keneally being ill.

References

External links
Sky News Official site

Sky News Australia
Australian non-fiction television series
English-language television shows
2016 Australian television series debuts